Pamela Cooper may refer to:

Pamela Cooper (1910–2006), British courtier, campaigner for refugees, and humanitarian
Pamela Cooper, fictional character in The Inbetweeners
Pamela Rebecca Cooper, fictional character in Dallas

See also
Pamela Cooper-White, theologian